Khalid Outaleb (born 27 April 1963) is a Moroccan former professional tennis player.

Born in Casablanca, Outaleb was a collegiate tennis player for Florida Institute of Technology from 1983 to 1986, claiming two Sunshine State Conference Singles Championships.

Outaleb, a two-time national singles champion, turned professional in 1988 and reached a best world ranking of 246. He was a playing member of the Morocco Davis Cup team from 1988 to 1990, registering wins in nine singles and five doubles rubbers.

See also
List of Morocco Davis Cup team representatives

References

External links
 
 
 

1963 births
Living people
Moroccan male tennis players
Competitors at the 1983 Mediterranean Games
Florida Institute of Technology alumni
College men's tennis players in the United States
Sportspeople from Casablanca